Tatarbayevo (Tatarbay) is a rural locality (a selo) and the administrative centre of Mavlyutovsky Selsoviet, Mishkinsky District, Bashkortostan, Russia. The population was 445 as of 2010. There are 9 streets.

Geography 
Tatarbayevo is located 13 km north of Mishkino (the district's administrative centre) by road. Yelyshevo is the nearest rural locality.

References 

Rural localities in Mishkinsky District